Robert Forster (1941–2019) was an American actor.

Robert Forster may also refer to:

Robert Forster (Australian politician) (1818–1880), New South Wales politician
Robert Forster (musician) (born 1957), Australian musician, member of The Go-Betweens
Robert Forster (Quaker) (1791–1873), British Quaker
Robert J. Forster, professor of physical chemistry
Robert Förster (born 1978), German cyclist
Robert Forster (footballer) (born 1909), English footballer, played for Throckley Welfare, Coventry City, Frickley Colliery and Rochdale between 1929 and 1932

See also 
 Robert Foster (disambiguation)